The 2023 Lindenwood Lions men's volleyball team represents Lindenwood University in the 2023 NCAA Division I & II men's volleyball season. The Lions, led by fifth year head coach Joe Kosciw, play their home games at Robert F. Hyland Arena. The Lions are members of the Midwestern Intercollegiate Volleyball Association and were picked to finish seventh in the MIVA preseason poll. Because D1 and D2 men's volleyball are combined, Lindenwood's move to D1's OVC doesn't affect the men's volleyball program, and they are eligible for all postseason play.

Roster

Schedule

 *-Indicates conference match.
 Times listed are Central Time Zone.

Broadcasters
Grand Canyon: Houston Boe & Braden Dohrmann
Grand Canyon: Braden Dohrmann & Houston Boe
NJIT: Michael Wagenknecht & Sara Wagenknecht
Long Beach State: Matt Brown & Tyler Kulakowski
LIU: Michael Wagenknecht & Sara Wagenknecht
Missouri S&T: 
Purdue Fort Wayne: 
Loyola Chicago: 
McKendree: 
Lewis: 
Ball State: 
Ohio State: 
Quincy: 
King: 
Maryville: 
Quincy: 
Ohio State: 
Ball State: 
Loyola Chicago: 
Purdue Fort Wayne: 
Lewis: 
McKendree:

Rankings 

^The Media did not release a Pre-season poll.

Honors
To be filled in upon competition of the season.

References

2023 in sports in Missouri
2023 NCAA Division I & II men's volleyball season
Lindenwood